Kenyatta High School (Mahiga) is located in Nyeri County, Kenya.

History
The school was started before Kenya attained independence in 1963. It was started by the community, to offer education to students of parents segregated and denied education by the colonists. The school was first known as Kagere High School, then Mahiga High School and later named Kenyatta High School (Mahiga) in 1965. When the state of emergency was declared in 1952, the school was banned and deregistered on the grounds that its founders were sympathetic or followers of the Mau Mau movement, a group of nationalist Kenyans fighting the British occupation of Kenya.

The school opened again on 1966 and was officially opened on 30 March 1969 by Mbiu Koinange, Minister of State, named Kenyatta High School (Mahiga), after the first President of the Republic of Kenya. The school is sponsored by the African Independent Pentecostal Church of Africa - AIPCA.

Assistance from the Peace Corps and charitable non-governmental organizations such as Voluntary Service Overseas made it possible for the school to continue running and admitting students. Some of the people who helped the school during the formative stages included Mr. Dunstan Kiboi Wariua and Mr. Nguya Kaguora, whilst some teachers were VSO and Peace Corps volunteers, such as Mr. Mansel Richards (1968–1970), Mr. Al Giles (1969–1971) Eluned Barton (1970-1971 and Mr. Hugh Allen (1970-1973)

Curriculum
The school teaches most of the subjects offered by secondary school education. One of the subjects taught is French and the school is ranked number 18 in the country

Old Boys' activities

Environmental conservation

Tree planting and awareness initiatives
The environment of KHSM had been neglected. Evidence from past vs recent pictures and information from visits by old boys, show that the natural vegetation that covered the school in the 1980s and 1990s has been destroyed or cleared. Destruction of the environment was mainly attributed to poverty, ignorance, and inaction.

To restore and beautify the school compound, the old boys and girls of KHSM began an initiative spearheaded by members of the  Subcommittee on Environment and Science (SES) who are working with the Alumni Executive Committee (AEC). Members of SES (who include George G. Ndiritu of National Museums of Kenya, Peter Wamugunda, Richard Mwangi, Evanson Kariuki of Bushmeat-Free Eastern Africa Network, Ringaru Gichane) are spearheading activities to green and beautify KHSM as well as promote environmental conservation in the school and community.

They aim to:
 Support environmental activities in schools such as tree growing, and promotion of an agroforestry system at KHSM.
 Equip students in the school with skills on environmental conservation and restoration, through public education, seminars, mentoring, and workshops.
 Increase the green cover in KHSM as well as in the surrounding areas. Students can educate locals on how to establish tree nurseries with an aim of planting fruits and indigenous trees in an area.
 Run student tours to national parks and environmental awareness festivals/ meetings.
 Training of teachers and students on Environmental Education (EE).
 Make the school the centre of excellence on matters pertaining to environmental conservation.
 Link schools with national and tertiary institution clubs or forums participating in environmental conservation such as universities, colleges, government, parastatals and departments.

Achievements
The first tree planting exercise was carried out on March 26, 2011 when 1,700 trees were planted.
 Environmental Awards. One of the SES members, Peter Wamugunda, donated KSh. 5,000 during the 2011 School Open Day, which were given to four students who excelled in Environmental Conservation in the school.

References

External links
Kenyatta High School (Mahiga) official website
Directory of the teaching of French in Kenya

High schools and secondary schools in Kenya
Nyeri County